Mondo Canuck: A Canadian Pop Culture Odyssey is a 1996 book by Geoff Pevere and Greig Dymond, collecting critical essays on Canadian pop culture.

Cultural phenomena covered in the book include Canadian music, Trivial Pursuit, SCTV, Pierre Trudeau, Stompin' Tom Connors, Moses Znaimer, game shows, hockey and Goin' Down the Road.

1996 non-fiction books
Canadian essay collections
Books about Canada
Popular culture books